Matrosov is a Russian-language surname derived from the term matros, "seaman". Notable peoploe with the surname include:
Alexander Matrosov
Boris Matrosov
Denis Matrosov

See also

17354 Matrosov, minor planet

Russian-language surnames